The Saturn C-4 was the fourth rocket in the Saturn C series studied from 1959 to 1962. The C-4 design was proposed in 1960 for a three-stage launch vehicle that could launch  to low Earth orbit and send  to the Moon via trans-lunar injection.  It met the initial requirements for a lunar orbit rendezvous and lunar landing mission.

It would have consisted of three stages; an S-IB-4 first stage, a S-II-4 second stage and a S-IVB third stage. The first and second stages were essentially four-engine variants of the stages that would be used on the Saturn V, while the IVB stage was actually used on both the Saturn V and the Saturn IB.

It would have been capable of sending the  Apollo Command/Service Module into lunar orbit, but it would not have been able to carry the  Apollo Lunar Module as well.  Although NASA eventually used the lunar orbit rendezvous method to go to the Moon, it decided to use the larger Saturn V which would provide a reserve payload capacity.

See also
Saturn C-3
List of space launch system designs

References 

 

Encyclopedia Astronautica Saturn C-4
Bilstein, Roger E, Stages to Saturn, US Government Printing Office, 1980. . Excellent account of the evolution, design, and development of the Saturn launch vehicles.
Stuhlinger, Ernst, et al., Astronautical Engineering and Science: From Peenemuende to Planetary Space, McGraw-Hill, New York, 1964.
 NASA, "Earth Orbital Rendezvous for an Early Manned Lunar Landing," pt. I, "Summary Report of Ad Hoc Task Group Study" [Heaton Report], August 1961.
 David S. Akens, Saturn Illustrated Chronology: Saturn's First Eleven Years, April 1957 through April 1968, 5th ed., MHR-5 (Huntsville, AL : MSFC, 20 Jan. 1971).

Apollo program
C4
Cancelled space launch vehicles